Snorrason Holdings is an Icelandic holding company with primary interests in online payment processing. It also has an Internet marketing division.
Its headquarters are in Dalvík, North Iceland.

History 
Snorrason Holdings was founded in 2003 by the Snorrason family of Dalvík who are known in Iceland because of the entrepreneurial work of Snorri Snorrason, Snr (1940–2003) who pioneered the shrimp industry in Iceland.

Divisions 
Its divisions include DalPay Internet Billing.

References 

Holding companies of Iceland
Software companies of Iceland
Financial services companies of Iceland
Dalvík